Guibourtinidin is an anthocyanidin.

Tannins
Guibourtinidin forms tannins called leucoguibourtinidins or proguibourtinidins.

References

External links
 Guibourtinidin on chemicalbook.com

Anthocyanidins